Riccardo Marcuzzo (born 4 February 1992), better known as Riki is an Italian singer and songwriter who rose to fame after finishing as runner-up on the sixteen season of the Italian talent show Amici di Maria De Filippi.

Early life and career
Marcuzzo is born in Segrate, but since his childhood he lives in Pessano con Bornago, in the province of Milan.
From the young age he approached the acting, taking part in several courses, but later he understood that it was not the way for him; For this reason he decided to approach to the music and at seventeen he started taking the first singing lessons. In 2016, he took part in the sixteen season of the Italian talent show Amici di Maria De Filippi, he finished as runner-up behind dancer Andreas Muller. During his participation of the Amici di Maria De Filippi he signed with label Sony Music Italy.

On 5 May 2017 he released the lead single from his debut EP of the same name, Perdo le parole peaked at 11 on the Italian FIMI Singles Chart. The EP was later released on 19 May 2017 and debuted atop on the Italian Albums Chart. After two weeks on the chart it was certified Gold.

In September 2017 he released an interview on the Italian Magazine TV Sorrisi e Canzoni about his new album and his first tour. 
On 29 September 2017 he released "Se parlassero di noi", the lead single from his upcoming album "Mania" will be released on 20 October 2017.

He participated at the Sanremo Music Festival 2020 with the song "Lo sappiamo entrambi" ("We both know"), finishing last.

Discography

Albums

EP

Singles

As featured artist

Other charted songs

References

1992 births
Living people
People from Segrate
Singing talent show contestants
21st-century Italian male  singers
Italian pop singers
Spanish-language singers of Italy